Argame is one of seven parishes (administrative divisions) in Morcín, a municipality within the province and autonomous community of Asturias, in northern Spain.

Villages
 Argame
 La Carrera de Abajo
 El Collado
 La Rectoría y Roces

References

Parishes in Morcin